Dangerous Clues (German: Auf gefährlichen Spuren) is a 1924 German silent crime film directed by Harry Piel and starring Piel, Henrik Galeen and Dary Holm. It was shot at the EFA Studios in Berlin and distributed by the Munich-based Bavaria Film. The film's sets were designed by the art director Kurt Richter. It premiered in Berlin on 10 June 1924.

Cast
 Harry Piel as Harry 
 Henrik Galeen as Francis Margreit 
 Dary Holm as Dorothy 
 Fred Immler as Thomas 
 Esther Carena as Gitty 
 Jenny Marba as Marianne 
 Paul Meffert as Bluntzli 
 Gustav Oberg as Der Fürst

References

Bibliography
 Grange, William. Cultural Chronicle of the Weimar Republic. Scarecrow Press, 2008.

External links

1924 films
Films of the Weimar Republic
German silent feature films
German crime films
1924 crime films
Films directed by Harry Piel
German black-and-white films
Bavaria Film films
1920s German films
Films shot at Halensee Studios